Mechanical testing covers a wide range of tests, which can be divided broadly into two types:
 those that aim to determine a material's mechanical properties, independent of geometry.
 those that determine the response of a structure to a given action, e.g. testing of composite beams, aircraft structures to destruction, etc.

Mechanical testing of materials 

There exists a large number of tests, many of which are standardized, to determine the various mechanical properties of materials. In general, such tests set out to obtain geometry-independent properties; i.e. those intrinsic to the bulk material. In practice this is not always feasible, since even in tensile tests, certain properties can be influenced by specimen size and/or geometry. Here is a listing of some of the most common tests:

Hardness Testing
Vickers hardness test (HV), which has one of the widest scales
Brinell hardness test (HB)
Knoop hardness test (HK), for measurement over small areas
Janka hardness test, for wood
Meyer hardness test
Rockwell hardness test (HR), principally used in the USA
Shore durometer hardness, used for polymers
Barcol hardness test, for composite materials
Tensile testing, used to obtain the stress-strain curve for a material, and from there, properties such as Young modulus, yield (or proof) stress, tensile stress and % elongation to failure.
Impact testing
Izod test
Charpy test
Fracture toughness testing
Linear-elastic (KIc)
K–R curve
Elastic plastic (JIc, CTOD)
Creep Testing, for the mechanical behaviour of materials at high temperatures (relative to their melting point)
Fatigue Testing, for the behaviour of materials under cyclic loading
Load-controlled smooth specimen tests
Strain-controlled smooth specimen tests
Fatigue crack growth testing
Non-Destructive Testing

References

General references 

Materials science
Materials testing
Tests